General elections were held in Bolivia on 9 July 1978. The elections were the first held since 1966, with several military coups taking place during the late 1960s and early 1970s. Although Juan Pereda of the Nationalist Union of the People won the presidential elections according to official statements, more votes were cast than there were registered voters. After examining a number of allegations of fraud and other irregularities, the Electoral Court decided to annul the results on 20 July. The following day, Pereda was installed as President following a military coup. Pereda himself was overthrown by yet another military coup in November, which saw General David Padilla assume the presidency. Fresh elections were held the following year, with Padilla transferring power to his democratically elected successor, Wálter Guevara.

Campaign
Several alliances were formed for the elections:

Juan Pereda was supported in his presidential bid by both the Nationalist Union of the People and the Nationalist Revolutionary Movement of the People, whilst René Bernal Escalante was the candidate of both the PDC–PRB alliance and the Eastern Rural Party.

Results
The official results were inconsistent; the reported total number of votes cast was 1,971,968, around 50,000 more than the number of registered voters (1,921,556), giving a turnout of 102.6%. However, the total of votes cast for each party and invalid votes was 1,990,671, nearly 20,000 higher than the reported total and representing a turnout of 103.6%.

References

Notes

Footnotes

Bibliography 
 
 

Annulled elections
Elections in Bolivia
Bolivia
1978 in Bolivia
Presidential elections in Bolivia